Lucy Collinson is a microbiologist, electron microscopist and scientist working at the Francis Crick Institute in London. She is the head of electron microscopy.

Early career
In 1998, Collinson completed a PhD in molecular microbiology at Barts and The London School of Medicine and Dentistry.

References

External links

Year of birth missing (living people)
Living people
21st-century British scientists
Alumni of Barts and The London School of Medicine and Dentistry
British microbiologists
Electron microscopy